Shorty Rogers and His Giants is an album by American jazz trumpeter, composer and arranger Shorty Rogers originally released by RCA Victor in 1953 as a 10-inch LP and reissued in 1956 in the 12 inch format with four additional tracks.

Reception

Allmusic awarded the album 3 stars.

Track listing 
All compositions by Shorty Rogers except where noted.
 "Morpo" - 3:27
 "Bunny" - 3:25
 "Powder Puff" - 2:49
 "Mambo del Crow" - 3:02
 "Joycycle" - 2:39 Bonus track on 12 inch LP
 "The Lady Is a Tramp" (Richard Rodgers,  Lorenz Hart) - 2:17 Bonus track on 12 inch LP
 "The Pesky Serpent" (Jimmy Giuffre) - 2:38
 "Diablo's Dance" - 3:17
 "Pirouette" - 3:10
 "Indian Club" (Giuffre) - 2:35
 "The Goof and I" (Al Cohn) - 2:53 Bonus track on 12 inch LP
 "My Little Suede Shoes" (Charlie Parker) - 2:46 Bonus track on 12 inch LP
Recorded at RCA Studios in Hollywood, CA on January 12, 1953 (tracks 2, 3, 7 & 9), January 15, 1953 (tracks 1, 4, 8 & 10) and October 10, 1954 (tracks 5, 6, 11 & 12)

Personnel 
Shorty Rogers - trumpet, arranger
Milt Bernhart - trombone (tracks 1-4 & 7-10)
John Graas - French horn (tracks 1-4 & 7-10)
Gene Englund - tuba (tracks 1-4 & 7-10)
Art Pepper - alto saxophone (tracks 1-4 & 7-10)
Jimmy Giuffre -  tenor saxophone  
Hampton Hawes (tracks 1-4 & 7-10), Pete Jolly  (tracks 5, 6, 11 & 12) - piano
Curtis Counce (tracks 1-4 & 7-10), Joe Mondragon (tracks 5, 6, 11 & 12) - bass 
Shelly Manne - drums

References 

Shorty Rogers albums
1953 albums
RCA Records albums